is a Japanese male Volleyball player. On club level, he captained JTEKT Stings team, in V.League Division 1, since 2019–20 season. He is a former member of the Japan men's national volleyball team.

Career 
When he was in elementary school, he started playing volleyball under the influence of his family.

After graduated from Yaei High School, Homma entered Waseda University. The first two years in the college, he served as substitute of Wing spiker and Setter, but later, he was changed to Libero in the third year. And in the fourth year, the team won Kanto University Autumn League and All Japan Intercollegiate Volleyball Championship. Homma also won the Best Libero award in both tournaments.

In October 2013, he decided to join JTEKT Stings, which had just been promoted to the V.Premier League, the name was changed to V.League Division 1 in 2018.

In 2018, he was first elected as Japan men's national volleyball team representative. He transferred to Paris Volley in the 2018/19 season.

In the 2019/20 season, he returned to Stings and became captain. He led the team won the first V.League title of the club's history and received the Best Libero award.

Awards

Individual 
 2013 Kanto University Autumn League — Best Libero
 2013 All Japan Intercollegiate Volleyball Championship — Best Libero
 2019–20 V.League 1 — Best Libero

Club team 
 2013 Kanto University Autumn League —  Champion, with Waseda University
 2013 All Japan Intercollegiate Volleyball Championship —  Champion, with Waseda University
2019–20 V.League 1 —  Champion, with JTEKT Stings
2020 Emperor's Cup —  Champion, with JTEKT Stings
2022 Emperor's Cup —  Champion, with JTEKT Stings

See also 
 Ryuta Homma profile at JTEKT Stings website
 Ryuta Homma profile at V.League website
 List of Waseda University people

References 

1991 births
Japanese men's volleyball players
Living people
Sportspeople from Kanagawa Prefecture
Waseda University alumni
Japanese expatriate sportspeople in France
21st-century Japanese people